Raffles is a 1977 television series adapted from the A. J. Raffles stories by E. W. Hornung. The stories were adapted by Philip Mackie.

Set in Victorian era London, the series features the criminal adventures of gentleman thief A. J. Raffles, a renowned cricketer, and his friend, the eager but naive Bunny Manders, as they test their skills in relieving the wealthy of their valuables whilst avoiding detection, especially from Inspector Mackenzie.

The episodes were largely faithful adaptations of the stories in the books, though occasionally two stories would be merged to create one episode, such as "The Gold Cup", which featured elements from two short stories, "A Jubilee Present" and "The Criminologist's Club". The series has been released on DVD.

Regular cast
Anthony Valentine as A. J. Raffles, a clever and daring gentleman who is a well-known cricketer and also secretly an expert burglar
Christopher Strauli as Bunny Manders, Raffles's loyal friend and accomplice, who is more idealistic and naive than Raffles
Victor Carin as Inspector Mackenzie, a diligent Scottish detective from Scotland Yard who is suspicious of Raffles
Victor Brooks as the porter at the Albany, the prestigious address where Raffles lives

Production
The 1975 pilot was produced by Peter Willes, and the producer of the 1977 series was Jacky Stoller. The executive producer of the series was David Cunliffe and the theme music was by Anthony Isaac. The production company was Yorkshire Television. Screenwriter Philip Mackie adapted the episodes from the A. J. Raffles stories of author E. W. Hornung.

Filming for the full series took place during the summer of 1976, which saw Britain experiencing a prolonged heatwave. Actors remembered how hot it was filming outdoor scenes, especially wearing their heavy Victorian costumes and stiff collars.

The Albany refused to give Yorkshire Television permission to film on their grounds, so the production team instead built their own exterior. The television series took six months to film and was shot on a mixture of video and film.

Some episodes were released on VHS. The series was later released on DVD.

Episodes

Reception

In his book Raffles and His Creator, Peter Rowland praised the television series for its fidelity to Hornung's stories, stating that the adapter Philip Mackie kept as close as he could to the spirit and dialogue of the original stories. Rowland noted that, while the series simplified the Raffles saga by keeping A. J. Raffles a well-known cricketer living at the Albany (unlike in the original stories, in which Raffles's situation changes in the short story "The Gift of the Emperor"), the basic characters of Raffles and Bunny were brought more accurately to life than in any previous adaptation. Rowland also stated that Raffles had previously been portrayed with non-canonical features (for example, both David Niven and Ronald Colman portrayed Raffles with a moustache). Compared to previous actors, Anthony Valentine portrayed Raffles with an appearance closer to the slim, dark-haired, clean-shaven description of the original character, with Bunny Manders (Christopher Strauli) being fair-haired and appearing a few years younger than Raffles, as in the stories.

According to Rowland, the series was positively received by viewers and critics. David Pryce-Jones wrote in The Listener (3 March 1977): "Raffles has become a serial. In Anthony Valentine, what is more, Raffles has been splendidly personified, a lean, dark figure with a smile at once engaging and slightly saturnine. The eye is cold, the manner debonair. He looks as if he could well play cricket for England and would steal any tiara without compunction."

The series was nominated in 1978 for the BAFTA TV Awards for Best Costume Design (Brian Castle), Make-up (Phillippa Haigh), and VTR Editor (the Yorkshire TV Team).

References

External links

1977 British television series debuts
1977 British television series endings
ITV television dramas
Period television series
Television shows based on British novels
Works based on A. J. Raffles
Television series by Yorkshire Television
English-language television shows
1970s British crime television series
1970s British drama television series